

The Blériot-SPAD S.92 was a French one-seat, single-engine biplane flight training aircraft designed in the 1920s

Design
The S.92 was a biplane of wood and metal construction.

Operators
 
 Aéronautique Militaire

Specification

References

Blériot aircraft
Single-engined tractor aircraft
Biplanes
1920s French military trainer aircraft
Aircraft first flown in 1928